Joplin may refer to:

Places in the United States
Joplin, Missouri
Joplin, Missouri metropolitan area
Joplin, Montana
Joplin, Texas
Joplin, Virginia (now extinct)
Joplin, West Virginia

People
Joplin (surname), people with the surname, most notably:
Janis Joplin (1943–1970), American singer-songwriter
Scott Joplin (1867–1917), American ragtime composer

Others
A Night with Janis Joplin, a Broadway musical
Joplin (software), an open source note taking and to-do application
Joplin High School, a public High School in Joplin, Missouri
Joplin Miners, a defunct minor league baseball team in Joplin, Missouri
Joplin Regional Airport, a regional airport next to Joplin, Missouri
Joplin Tundra, a family of Canadian aircraft
"Joplin", a development codename of the video game Dragon Age 4

See also
2011 Joplin tornado, an extremely deadly tornado that devastated Joplin, Missouri